Monostarch phosphate, E1410 in the E number scheme of food additives, is a modified starches. These are not absorbed intact by the gut, but are significantly hydrolysed by intestinal enzymes and then fermented by intestinal microbiota.

References

E-number additives